Head Lake is a dispersed rural community and unincorporated place located in the city of Kawartha Lakes, Ontario, Canada, on Head Lake between Uphill (to the west) and Norland (to the east).

References

Communities in Kawartha Lakes